Larsen Touré (born 20 July 1984) is a French-born Guinean professional footballer who plays as a winger or forward for SC Schiltigheim. He has represented the Guinea national team at international level.

Club career
Touré was born in Brest, France. After playing several seasons with Lille OSC, he returned to his hometown club Stade Brestois 29 in summer 2010 where he gained a starting spot.

In September 2013 he signed a two-year contract with Bulgarian side Levski Sofia, and made 23 appearances for the club, scoring four times. He was released at the end of his contract.

On 1 August 2015, Touré signed for Ipswich Town after spending his pre-season on trial there and making appearances in a number of friendlies. Touré made his debut on 11 August 2015 against Stevenage. He received a knock in the first half, requiring the physio to come on. He finished the first half, but was taken off at half time. Touré left Ipswich Town at the end of his one-year contract.

In November 2017, Touré signed for French lower-league side US Choisy au Bac.

International career
Touré made his debut for Guinea in a friendly against Ivory Coast on 20 August 2008. Between 2008 and 2013, he made seven appearances for the Guinea national team.

Career statistics

International

References

External links
 
 
   
 
 Profile at Levskisofia.info 

1984 births
Living people
Sportspeople from Brest, France
Footballers from Brittany
Black French sportspeople
French sportspeople of Guinean descent
Citizens of Guinea through descent
Guinean footballers
French footballers
Association football wingers
Association football forwards
Guinea international footballers
Ligue 1 players
Ligue 2 players
Championnat National 2 players
First Professional Football League (Bulgaria) players
Lille OSC players
FC Gueugnon players
Grenoble Foot 38 players
Stade Brestois 29 players
PFC Levski Sofia players
AC Arlésien players
Ipswich Town F.C. players
UE Engordany players
SC Schiltigheim players
Guinean expatriate footballers
Guinean expatriate sportspeople in France
Expatriate footballers in France
Expatriate footballers in Bulgaria
Expatriate footballers in England
Guinean expatriate sportspeople in England